Matheus Lima Beltrão Oliveira (born 4 May 1999), known as Matheus Bidu or simply Bidu, is a Brazilian footballer who plays as a left back for Corinthians.

Club career
Born in São Paulo, Bidu joined Guarani's youth setup in 2018, after representing Portuguesa and Lemense. On 17 January 2019, after impressing with the under-20s in the year's Copa São Paulo de Futebol Júnior, he renewed his contract with the club for three years.

Bidu made his professional debut on 21 September 2019, starting in a 1–0 Série B home win against Paraná. He contributed with four league appearances during the campaign, as his side avoided relegation.

Bidu scored his first senior goal on 2 February 2020, netting a last-minute winner in a 2–1 home defeat of Santo André for the Campeonato Paulista championship.

Career statistics

References

External links
 Bidu profile at JogosdoGuarani.com 
 

1999 births
Living people
Footballers from São Paulo
Brazilian footballers
Association football defenders
Campeonato Brasileiro Série A players
Campeonato Brasileiro Série B players
Guarani FC players
Cruzeiro Esporte Clube players
Sport Club Corinthians Paulista players